Franz Xaver Kleinheinz (26 June 1765 – 29 January 1832) was an Austrian composer, piano teacher and Kapellmeister.

Life 
Born in  near Mindelheim, Kleinheinz first went to Munich and in 1799 to Vienna, where he met Beethoven and soon became a sought-after piano teacher. His pupils included Giulietta Guicciardi and the sisters Therese Brunsvik and Josephine Brunsvik. From 1805, he took up a second residence in Brno and in August 1810 he was appointed as Kapellmeister in Bratislava. At the beginning of May 1813, it is said that Kleinheinz, "one of the most excellent piano players", had resigned from his post in Pressburg and returned to Vienna. From 1814 to 1824, he worked as a conductor at the Deutsches Theater in Pest.

Kleinheinz died in Pest at the age of 66.

Works 
 Fantaisie Sonate pour le Piano-Forte composée et dédiée à Son Excellence Madame la Comtesse de Brunsvik Maythény, op. 7, Vienna: Joseph Eder [1801]
 Sonate pour le Pianoforte avec l'Accompagnement d'un Violon obligé, composée et dédiée à Mad. la Comtesse Therese de Brunswik, op. 9 (Numerized)
 Hektors Abschied (Schiller) op. 10 für 1–2 Singstimmen und Cembalo, Vienna: Kunst- und Industrie-Comptoir [1802]
 Der Handschuh (Schiller) op. 11 für Singstimme und Cembalo, Wien: Kunst- und Industrie-Comptoir [1802]
 Grande Sonate pour le Piano-Forte à quatre mains, composée et dediée aux Demoiselles les Comtesses Julie et Henriette de Brunswick, op. 12, Vienna: Kunst- und Industrie-Comptoir
 Trio für Klarinette, Violoncello und Klavier op. 13, Vienna: Bureau d'Arts et d'Industrie, 1802
 Der Kampf (Schiller) op. 14 für Gesang und Klavier, "dem Herrn Grafen Georg von Bérényi gewidmet", Vienna: Kunst- u. Industrie Comptoir
 Trois grandes sonates pour le fortepiano, ou clavecin op. 17, Leipzig: Hoffmeister und Kühnel [1803]
 La passione di Gesù Cristo, 1813
 Notturno D-Dur für Klavier und Viola op. 42 by Ludwig van Beethoven, bearbeitet by Franz Xaver Kleinheinz
 Die Empfehlungsfeier. Schlußkantate bey Gelegenheit der ersten Vorstellung unter der neuen Direktion des Herrn Johann Baptist Mayer, den 15. April von der Gesellschaft abgesungen. Die Worte sind von Herrn Tobias Frech E. v. Ehrimfeld. Die Musik von Franz Xaver Kleinheinz, Kapellmeister des k. städtischen Nationaltheaters in Brünn, Brünn: Franz Karl Siedler 1805 (Numerized)

References

Further reading 
 
 Adolf Sandberger, Franz Xaver Kleinheinz. In Ausgewählte Aufsätze zur Musikgeschichte, vol. 2, Munich 1924, .

 Arthur Maximilian Miller, Franz Xaver Kleinheinz. In Veröffentlichungen der Schwäbischen Forschungsgemeinschaft bei der Kommission für Bayerische Landesgeschichte, Band 10, ca. 1974, S. 152–178.
 Arthur Maximilian Miller, Franz Xaver Kleinheinz. In Lebensbilder aus dem Bayerischen Schwaben, vol. 12, edited by Adolf Layer, 1980,
 Peter Clive, Beethoven and His World: A Biographical Dictionary, New York 2001, S. 186 f.
 Klaus Martin Kopitz, Rainer Cadenbach (ed.) among others: Beethoven aus der Sicht seiner Zeitgenossen in Tagebüchern, Briefen, Gedichten und Erinnerungen. Vol. 1: Adamberger – Kuffner. Edited by the Beethoven-Forschungsstelle an der Universität der Künste Berlin. Henle, Munich 2009, .

External links 
 
 

Austrian composers
1765 births
1832 deaths
People from Mindelheim